John Michael Hawthorn (10 April 1929 – 22 January 1959) was a British racing driver. He became the United Kingdom's first Formula One World Champion driver in 1958, whereupon he announced his retirement, having been profoundly affected by the death of his teammate and friend Peter Collins two months earlier in the 1958 German Grand Prix. Hawthorn also won the 1955 24 Hours of Le Mans, but was haunted by his involvement in the disastrous crash that marred the race. Hawthorn died in a road accident three months after retiring. With a total of three career World Championship Grand Prix wins Hawthorn has the lowest number of Grand Prix wins scored by any Formula One World Champion.

Early life
Mike Hawthorn was born in Mexborough, West Riding of Yorkshire, England, to Leslie and Winifred (née Symonds) Hawthorn, and educated at Ardingly College, West Sussex, followed by studies at Chelsea technical college and an apprenticeship with a commercial vehicle manufacturer. His father owned the Tourist Trophy Garage in Farnham, franchised to supply and service several high performance brands, including Jaguar and Ferrari. His father raced motorcycles and supported his son's racing career; when he died in a road accident, in 1954, Mike Hawthorn inherited the business.

Racing career
Mike Hawthorn made his competition debut on 2 September 1950 in his 1934 Riley Ulster Imp, KV 9475, winning the 1,100 cc sports car class at the Brighton Speed Trials. In 1951, driving a -litre T.T. Riley, he entered the Motor Sport Brooklands Memorial Trophy, a season-long contest run at Goodwood, winning it by one point. He also won the Ulster Trophy Handicap at Dundrod and the Leinster Trophy at Wicklow that year.

1952
By 1952, Hawthorn had switched to single-seaters and during that season won his first race in a Formula Two Cooper-Bristol T20 at Goodwood. Further successes followed which brought him to the attention of Enzo Ferrari, who offered him a works drive. He made his Formula One debut at the 1952 Grote Prijs van Belgie on the legendary Circuit de Spa-Francorchamps, finishing in fourth place. By the end of the season, he had already secured his first podium, with a third place at the RAC British Grand Prix and a brace of fourths driving a Cooper.

1953
At Scuderia Ferrari for the 1953 season, Hawthorn immediately showed his worth with victory, at his ninth attempt, in the French Grand Prix at Reims, outmanoeuvring Juan Manuel Fangio in what became dubbed 'the race of the century' with the top four drivers finishing within five seconds of each other after 60 laps. This and two other podium finishes helped him end the season fourth overall. He also won the BRDC International Trophy and the Ulster Trophy as well as the 24 Heures de Spa Francorchamps with Ferrari teammate Giuseppe Farina.

1954
Hawthorn's liability for conscription (National Service) was brought up in the House of Commons. In a crash during the Gran Premio di Siracusa Hawthorn suffered serious burns, but finished the year with three seconds and then victory in the season finale in Spain, placing him third in the Drivers' Championship. Following the death of his father, Hawthorn left Ferrari to race for Tony Vandervell's Vanwall team, as he needed to spend more time at the family garage he had inherited, but after two races returned to Ferrari.

1955

24 Hours of Le Mans

In January 1955, Hawthorn joined the Jaguar racing team, replacing Stirling Moss, who had left for Mercedes. Hawthorn won the 1955 les 24 Heures du Mans following what has been described as an inspired drive in which he set a lap record of 4 minutes and 6.6 seconds during a three-hour duel with Fangio in the early stages. However, the race was marred by the worst disaster in motor racing history, a crash which killed 83 spectators and Mercedes driver Pierre Levegh. After overtaking Lance Macklin's Healey, Hawthorn suddenly braked in front of him on noticing an order to enter the pits to refuel, causing Macklin to swerve into the path of Levegh's Mercedes. After colliding with the Healey, the Mercedes skipped the earthen embankment separating the spectator area from the track, bounced through spectator enclosures, then hit a concrete stairwell parapet head-on. The impact shattered the front end of the car, which then somersaulted high, pitching debris into the spectator area, before landing atop the earthen embankment. The debris, including bonnet, engine, and front axle, which separated from the frame, flew through the crowd.

Eight hours later, while leading the race 1.5 laps ahead of the Jaguar team, the Mercedes team withdrew from the race, ostensibly as a mark of respect for those who had perished in the accident; the Jaguar team was invited to join them but declined. The French press carried photographs of Hawthorn and Ivor Bueb celebrating their win with the customary champagne but treated them with scorn.

The official inquiry into the accident ruled that Hawthorn was not responsible for the crash, and that it was merely a racing incident. The death of so many spectators was blamed on inadequate safety standards for track design. That said, the circuit had been resurfaced and widened post-war. The pits and grandstands had been reconstructed, but there were no barriers between the pit lane and the racing line, and only a  earthen bank between the track and the spectators. The Grandstand and pit areas were demolished and rebuilt soon after. The death toll led to a ban on motorsports in France, Spain, Switzerland, Germany and other nations, until the tracks could be brought to a higher safety standard. In Switzerland motorsports are still banned with exceptions.

Dundrod
Whilst sharing the Jaguar D-Type with Desmond Titterington during the 1955 RAC Tourist Trophy at Dundrod, Hawthorn passed Fangio twice, and set the lap record for the RAC Tourist Trophy on the Dundrod Circuit, only to lose in the final stages when, running on full tanks, he was passed by Stirling Moss when the D Type's engine failed on the last lap.

1956-1957

Another change of team for 1956 – this time to BRM - was a failure, and Hawthorn's only podium came in Argentina where the non-appearance of his BRM allowed him to guest drive a Maserati 250F. However, when it appeared, usually only in British races, the new 2.5 BRM was very fast while it lasted, and Hawthorn held off Fangio, leading the first 25 laps at Silverstone in the British GP. He retired the car before half distance owing to deteriorating handling and brakes. Deeply unhappy with the BRM team's management and car preparation, Hawthorn walked out of the team at this point. Hawthorn had left Ferrari because driving for the British Jaguar sports car team was his first priority. He was favoured to win at Le Mans again, but lost ten laps in the pits early in the race, and while the D type repeatedly set fastest laps, the fuel consumption rules meant he could only finish sixth.

Racing the D type in Italy, Hawthorn crashed and suffered very serious burns, his second bad accident of the year, leaving him disillusioned with racing. However, he believed a return to Ferrari could give him the championship in the superior Lancia Ferrari D50. He had put the original Jano version of the car on the front row at its debut in the final F1 race of 1955 at Oulton Park. However, Ferrari's modified version of the design for 1957 was slower than Fangio and Collins's all-conquering 1956 Lancia Ferrari. The 1957 version, with the polar centred pannier tanks removed, still handled well, but was not the masterpiece Jano designed; it lacked straight line speed and was uncompetitive by mid 1957, clearly inferior to the new Vanwalls.

Hawthorn rejoined the Ferrari factory team in 1957, and soon became friends with Peter Collins, a fellow Englishman and Ferrari team driver. During the 1957 and 1958 racing seasons, the two Englishmen became engaged in a fierce rivalry with Luigi Musso, another Ferrari driver, for prize money.

1958 World Champion
Hawthorn won the  Formula One Championship despite achieving only one win, against four by Moss. Hawthorn won the 1958 French Grand Prix at Reims, in which Musso was fatally injured while in second place. Leading easily in the 1958 Monaco Grand Prix at half distance, his 246 engine blew, while at Monza he was a minute ahead of Tony Brooks when his clutch forced him to slow to second place. Hawthorn benefited greatly from the gentlemanliness of Moss, as demonstrated at the 1958 Portuguese Grand Prix at Porto. Hawthorn was disqualified for bump starting his stalled car downhill in the opposite direction, on the way to a second-place finish. Moss interceded on Hawthorn's behalf and the decision was ultimately reversed. After a pit stop midway through that race, Hawthorn accelerated back through the field to gain an extra point for fastest lap. Moss had failed to respond, possibly doubting Hawthorn could lap so fast with damaged drum brakes. This extra world championship point plus the second place points contributed to Hawthorn winning the championship with a season total just one more than that of Moss. In the final race, the 1958 Moroccan Grand Prix, Hawthorn drove a conservative tactical race aiming to stay ahead of Moss's Vanwall teammates. Brooks's car broke while narrowly leading Hawthorn, and Stuart Lewis-Evans in the third Vanwall crashed after a desperate attempt to move through the field and challenge Hawthorn running third; Evans later died of burns. In the last laps, second-placed Phil Hill slowed and waved Hawthorn through to gain enough points to take the Championship; the first ever to be won by an English driver. Hawthorn's total of just one win in his title winning season means that Hawthorn currently jointly holds the Formula One record for the fewest number of Grand Prix wins by an eventual drivers' champion during a title winning season along with Keke Rosberg (who also scored one win in his subsequent 1982 title winning season) 

After winning the title, Hawthorn immediately announced his retirement from Formula One. He began a series of books for children featuring not only the wholly fictional Carlotti but also himself and other drivers of the day ('Stirling nipped past me at the hairpin', and so on). The first, published in 1958, was Carlotti Joins the Team, and a second was published in 1959 called Carlotti Takes the Wheel. Due to his death, the series did not continue.

Hawthorn was noted for wearing a bow tie when racing; to the French, he became known as 'Le Papillon' (The Butterfly).

Rivalry with Luigi Musso
Fiamma Breschi, Luigi Musso's girlfriend at the time of his death, revealed the nature of Musso's rivalry with Hawthorn and Collins in a television documentary, The Secret Life of Enzo Ferrari, many years after the death of Hawthorn. Breschi recalled that the antagonism between Musso and the two English drivers encouraged all three to take more risks: "The Englishmen (Hawthorn and Collins) had an agreement", she says. "Whichever of them won, they would share the winnings equally. It was the two of them against Luigi, who was not part of the agreement. Strength comes in numbers, and they were united against him. This antagonism was actually favourable rather than damaging to Ferrari. The faster the drivers went, the more likely it was that a Ferrari would win." Breschi related that Musso was in debt at the time of his death, and the money for winning the 1958 French Grand Prix (traditionally the largest monetary prize of the season), was all-important to him.

After visiting the mortally injured Musso in hospital, Breschi returned to her hotel, where she and the rest of the Ferrari team were informed by the team manager that afternoon that Musso had died. Within thirty days Collins too was dead, and the following January, Hawthorn. Breschi could not suppress a feeling of release: "I had hated them both", she said, "first because I was aware of certain facts that were not right, and also because when I came out of the hospital and went back to the hotel, I found them in the square outside the hotel, laughing and playing a game of football with an empty beer can. So when they died, too, it was liberating for me. Otherwise I would have had unpleasant feelings towards them forever. This way I could find a sense of peace."

Personal life
Hawthorn never married, but fathered a son, Arnaud Michael Delaunay, with Jacqueline Delaunay, whom he met in Reims after winning the French Grand Prix in 1953. He was engaged at the time of his death to the fashion model Jean Howarth, who later married another racing driver, Innes Ireland, in 1993.

Death

On 22 January 1959, only three months into his retirement, Hawthorn died in a car accident on the A3 Guildford bypass while driving his comprehensively modified 1958 Jaguar 3.4-litre saloon (now known as the 3.4 Mk 1) VDU 881 to London. While the circumstances of the accident are well documented, the precise cause remains unknown.

The accident occurred on a notoriously dangerous section of the road, the scene of 15 serious accidents (two fatal) in the previous two years; the road was also wet at the time. Driving at speed (one witness estimated 80 m.p.h.), Hawthorn overtook a Mercedes-Benz 300SL 'gull-wing' sports car driven by an acquaintance, the motor racing team manager Rob Walker. On entering a right-hand bend shortly after passing the Mercedes, Hawthorn clipped a 'Keep Left' bollard dividing the two carriageways, causing him to lose control. The Jaguar glanced an oncoming Bedford lorry before careering back across the eastbound carriageway sideways into a roadside tree, uprooting it. The impact caused Hawthorn fatal head injuries and propelled him onto the rear seat.

There was inevitable speculation that Hawthorn and Walker had been racing each other, fuelled by Walker's persistent refusal at the coroner's inquest to estimate the speed of his own car at the time. In an interview with motor racing journalist Eoin Young and writer Eric Dymock in 1988, Walker admitted he had indeed been racing Hawthorn, but had been advised by a police officer investigating the accident to make no further mention of it lest he incriminate himself.

Possible causes of the accident include driver error, a blackout, or mechanical failure, although examination of the wreck revealed no obvious fault. There is evidence that Hawthorn had recently suffered blackouts, perhaps because of kidney failure. By 1955, Hawthorn had already lost one kidney to infection, and had begun suffering problems with the other; he was expected at the time to live only three more years.

At the coroner's inquest on 26 January the jury returned a verdict of accidental death. Hawthorn was buried in West Street Cemetery in Farnham.

Eponymy
In Farnham, the town where he lived up to the time of his death, there is a street named Mike Hawthorn Drive. It was in this town that Hawthorn ran the Tourist Trophy Garage which sold Jaguars, Rileys, Fiats and Ferraris. There is a hill and corner named after him at Brands Hatch and a corner at the Croft racing circuit at Croft-on-Tees in North Yorkshire, while in Towcester on the Shires estate, three miles from the Silverstone circuit, Hawthorn Drive is named after him. There is a statue at Goodwood Circuit commemorating Hawthorn as the UK's first Formula One World Champion.

Hawthorn Memorial Trophy

The Hawthorn Memorial Trophy has been awarded to the most successful British or Commonwealth Formula 1 driver every year since . Lewis Hamilton has won the award the most times, taking the trophy on eleven occasions, and being its current holder.

Racing record

Career highlights

Complete Formula One World Championship results
(key) (Races in bold indicate pole position; races in italics indicate fastest lap)

* Indicates Shared Drive

Formula One non-championship results
(key) (Races in bold indicate pole position)
(Races in italics indicate fastest lap)

* Indicates shared drive with Alberto Ascari

Complete 24 Hours of Le Mans results

Complete 12 Hours of Sebring results

Complete 24 Hours of Spa results

Complete Mille Miglia results

Complete 12 Hours of Reims results

Complete 12 Hours of Pescara results

References

Further reading

 Martin Shepherd. Too Fast A Life. Silverwood Books. 2015 .
 Tony Bailey & Paul Skilleter. Mike Hawthorn: Golden Boy. PJ Publishing Ltd. 2014 .

External links
 Mike Hawthorn's Biography from his Tribute Site
 1959 historic film of National Sporting Club Award

1929 births
People educated at Ardingly College
English racing drivers
Racing drivers from Yorkshire
Brighton Speed Trials people
English Formula One drivers
Ferrari Formula One drivers
Vanwall Formula One drivers
BRM Formula One drivers
Formula One World Drivers' Champions
Formula One race winners
24 Hours of Le Mans drivers
24 Hours of Le Mans winning drivers
12 Hours of Sebring drivers
12 Hours of Reims drivers
24 Hours of Spa drivers
BRDC Gold Star winners
People from Mexborough
Sportspeople from Doncaster
Road incident deaths in England
1959 deaths
World Sportscar Championship drivers
12 Hours of Pescara drivers